The fifth and final season of the television series Ally McBeal commenced airing in the United States on October 29, 2001, concluded on May 20, 2002, and consisted of 22 episodes. The entire season originally aired Mondays at 9pm, just like the seasons before. Following the episode that aired March 4, 2002, the show went on a six-week hiatus and was replaced by The American Embassy. The show returned on April 15, 2002, to air the final 7 episodes.

It was released on DVD as a six disc boxed set under the title of Ally McBeal: Season Five on February 10, 2003.

The fifth season had an average rating of 9.4 million viewers in the United States and was ranked #65 on the complete ranking sheet of all the year's shows. In addition to being the lowest-rated season of Ally McBeal and the grounds for the show's cancellation on April 18, 2002, it was also the only season of the show that failed to win any Emmy or Golden Globe awards.

Crew
The season was produced by 20th Century Fox Home Entertainment and David E. Kelley Productions. The executive producers were Bill D'Elia and the creator David E. Kelley, who also wrote 21 out of 22 episodes. (This season's "Blowin' in the Wind" is the only episode of the entire series which Kelley is not credited either with writing himself or with jointly writing.) Staff writers this season included Constance M. Burge, Roberto Benabib, Peter Blake and Cindy Lichtman. Cast member Peter MacNicol co-wrote the penultimate episodes with Kelley, while Greg Germann made his directing debut in the episode Fear of Flirting. Alice West served as the co-executive producer of this season.

Cast
The fifth season had twelve major roles receive star billing, the most out of all of the seasons. Calista Flockhart as Ally McBeal, Greg Germann as Richard Fish, Peter MacNicol as John Cage, Jane Krakowski as Elaine Vassal, Vonda Shepard as herself, Portia de Rossi as Nelle Porter and Lucy Liu as Ling Woo all returned to the main cast.

Robert Downey, Jr.'s Larry Paul was intended to be a main character in the fifth season.  The season arc had already been planned out, revolving around the married life of Larry and Ally, which had to be rewritten following Downey's arrest on drug charges.

Cast members Peter MacNicol and Lucy Liu only signed on for a certain number of episodes and were subsequently written out. MacNicol agreed to return on recurring status and stayed until the show's finale, whereas Liu was unable to return during the final episodes of the season due to her conflicting filming commitments for the film Charlie's Angels: Full Throttle. Former cast members Gil Bellows, Courtney Thorne-Smith and Lisa Nicole Carson returned for the finale.

The new cast members introduced in the season premiere were Julianne Nicholson as Jenny Shaw, Josh Hopkins as Raymond Millbury and James Marsden as Glenn Foy. Nicholson and Marsden's characters proved unpopular with the fans and were written out mid-season, while new character named Maddie Harrington, played by Hayden Panettiere was added to the regular cast. Regina Hall was upgraded to contract status after recurring during the previous season.

Various supporting characters from the previous seasons returned to reprise their recurring roles, including Albert Hall as Judge Seymore Walsh, John Michael Higgins as Steven Milter, and Renée Elise Goldsberry, Vatrena King and Sy Smith as the backup singers for Vonda Shepard. Jon Bon Jovi was added to the cast mid-season as Victor Morrison, Ally's new love interest, but was written out before the finale. Josh Groban returned as guest star Malcolm Wyatt. Barry Humphries, Matthew Perry and Christina Ricci all had recurring roles during the season. Elton John, Mariah Carey and Barry White appeared as performers at the bar. Shepard was offered to sing the theme song "Searchin' My Soul" from start to finish in the final episode, but she turned it down.

Episodes

References

External links
 Ally McBeal Episode List at IMDb.com

2001 American television seasons
2002 American television seasons
Ally McBeal